Shoe polish (or boot polish) is a waxy paste, cream, or liquid that is used to polish, shine, and waterproof leather shoes or boots to extend the footwear's life and restore its appearance. Shoe polishes are distinguished by their textures, which range from liquids to hard waxes. Solvent, waxes, and colorants comprise most shoe polishes.

Types
Shoe polish can be classified into three types: wax, cream-emulsion, and liquid.  Each differs in detailed composition, but all consist of a mixture of waxes, solvent, and dyes.

Wax-based shoe polish

Waxes, organic solvents and colorant (either soluble dyes or pigment) compose this type of polish.  Waxes are 20–40% of the material.  Natural waxes used for the polish include carnauba and  montan as well as synthetic waxes.  The composition determines the hardness and polishing properties after solvent has evaporated.  Solvents are selected to match the waxes. About 70% of shoe polish is solvent. A variety of solvents are used, including naphtha. Turpentine, although more expensive, is favored for its "shoe polish odor".  Dyes make up the final 2–3% of the polish.  A traditional dye is nigrosine, but other dyes (including azo dyes) and pigments are used for oxblood, cordovan, and brown polishes.

Owing to its high content of volatile solvents, wax-based shoe polish hardens after application, while retaining its gloss.  Poorly blended polishes are known to suffer from blooming, evidenced by the appearance of a white coating of stearin on the polish surface.

Cream-Emulsion shoe polish
These polishes may have a gelatinous consistency.  They are composed of the usual three components waxes, liquid vehicle, and dyes.  Unlike wax-based shoe polishes, cream-emulsions contain water and/or oil plus a solvent (either naphtha, turpentine or Stoddard Solution), so the liquid content is high.  Emulsifiers and surfactants are required.  These include ammonia, morpholine, and various ethoxylated surfactants such as polysorbate 80.  The waxes are often some mixture of carnauba wax, beeswax, montan wax and its oxidized derivatives, and paraffin waxes.

Liquid shoe polish
Liquid shoe polish is sold in a squeezable plastic bottle, with a small sponge applicator at the end. To decrease its viscosity, bottled polish usually has a very low wax content. Liquid shoe polish is a complex mixture. Polyethylene wax emulsion is a major component. Various polymers, typically acrylates, are the next major component, conferring gloss and holding the dyes in suspension. Resins and casein are selected to ensure adhesion to the leather.  Fatty phosphate esters, emulsifiers, and glycols are also used.  Pigments include titanium dioxide for whites and iron oxides for browns. Although liquid polish can put a fast shine on shoes, many experts warn against its long-term use because it can cause the leather to dry out and crack.

Manufacture

The process for producing shoe polish is straightforward and the required equipment is relatively easy to acquire. The cost of establishing shoe polish manufacturing facilities has been estimated at around $600,000 (as of 2005).

Shoe polish is manufactured in large, thermostated, stirred reactors. Steps are taken to ensure that volatile solvents do not evaporate. Typically, low-melting paraffin wax is melted, followed by the higher melting waxes, and finally the colorant-stearate mixture.  The molten mass is added to warm solvent before being dispensed. Wax-based shoe polish is traditionally packaged in flat, round, 60-gram (2-ounce) tins, usually with an easy-open facility. The traditional flat, round tins have since become synonymous with shoe polishes.  When dried due to solvent loss or other reasons, the hardened wax pulls away from the walls of the container, giving what is known as a "rattler".

History

Before the twentieth century

From medieval times, dubbin, a product of wax, was used to soften and waterproof leather; but it did not impart shine. It was made from natural wax, oil, soda ash and tallow. As leather with a high natural veneer became popular in the 18th century, a high glossy finish became important, particularly on shoes and boots. In most cases, homemade polishes were used to provide this finish, often with lanolin or beeswax as a base.

In the late 18th and early 19th century, many forms of shoe polish became available, yet were rarely referred to as shoe polish or boot polish. Instead, they were often called blacking, especially when mixed with lampblack, or still were referred to as dubbin. Tallow, an animal by-product, was used to manufacture a simple form of shoe polish at this time. Chicago, where 82% of the processed meat consumed in the United States was processed in the stockyards, became a major shoe polish producing area.

In London, the Warren brothers, Thomas and Jonathan, started making blacking around 1795–98, initially in partnership and then with competing companies. Jonathan Warren's Blacking company is noted as the first employer of the young Charles Dickens aged 12 in 1823. The competitor to the Warren companies in London is the Day & Martin company formed in 1801.

Details of the operation of Day & Martin in 1842 reveal that the blacking they produced was in two forms, bottled liquid, and a thick paste which was available in either small wide-mouthed stone tubs, slabs wrapped in oiled paper, or in "circular tin-boxes, about three inches in diameter, and half or three-quarters of an inch thick". Tinned blacking paste was at this time exclusively for army use. The text states, "Yet, as the soldier’s boots or shoes must to some extent emulate the brightness and glitter of the boots of those who pay for battles instead of fighting them, a portable blacking apparatus is provided." This confirms the tins as polish rather than dubbin.

In 1832, James S. Mason of Philadelphia began the commercial production of shoe blacking and inks. In 1851, James S. Mason & Co. constructed a building at 138/140 Front St. where ultimately ten million boxes were produced annually, to hold tins of blacking produced by two hundred employees. Later, tins of blacking were labeled as Mason Shoe Polish. This business ceased operation in 1919 and the building was razed in 1973.

Other early leather preserving products included the Irish brand Punch, which was first made in 1851. In 1889, an English man by the name of William Edward Wren, started making shoe polishes and dubbin under the brand name Wren's. In just 3 years, he won the “First in the Field – First Award Leather Trades Exhibition 1892″ award which was awarded by the Leather Trades Exhibition held in Northampton, the centre of Britain’s boot making industry. This signified the importance and prestige of the exhibition in the trade and was a recognition of Wren's quality. In 1890 the Kroner Brothers established EOS, a shoe polish factory in Berlin, which serviced the Prussian military. It finally closed in 1934 when the Nazis forbade Jews to operate a business. The German brand, Erdal, went on sale in 1901.

Prior to 1906, shoe polish was not well known as a purchasable product, nor was it particularly sophisticated. While sales were not especially high, a few brands, like Nugget, were available in the UK during the 19th century. The practice of shining people’s shoes gradually caught on and soon many shoeshine boys in city streets were offering shoe shines using a basic form of shoe polish along with a polishing cloth.

Modern polish

The first shoe polish to resemble the modern varieties (aimed primarily at inducing shine) were the British and British Commonwealth brands like Cherry Blossom, Kiwi, and Wren's. An advertisement published in March 1947 by Wren's claimed that William Wren originated the first wax polish in 1889. As the advertisement was endorsed with the Royal Warrant, its claim would be deemed creditable. However, the most well known brand was Kiwi; Scottish expatriates William Ramsay and Hamilton McKellan began making "boot polish" in a small factory in 1904 in Melbourne, Australia. Their formula was a major improvement on previous brands. It preserved shoe leather, made it shine, and restored colour. By the time Kiwi Dark Tan was released in 1908, it incorporated agents that added suppleness and water resistance. Black and a range of colors became available, and exports to Britain, continental Europe, and New Zealand began, although the polish is now made in the Far East. Previously owned by the Sara Lee Corporation since 1984, Kiwi was sold in 2011 to SC Johnson.

Ramsay named the shoe polish after the kiwi, the national bird of New Zealand; Ramsay's wife, Annie Elizabeth Meek Ramsay, was a native of Oamaru, New Zealand. It has been suggested that, at a time when several symbols were weakly associated with New Zealand, the eventual spread of Kiwi shoe polish around the world enhanced the kiwi's popular appeal and promoted it at the expense of the others.

A rival brand in the early years was Cobra Boot Polish, based in Sydney. Cobra was noted for a series of cartoon advertisements in The Sydney Bulletin, starting in 1909, using a character called "Chunder Loo of Akim Foo."  Chunder is Australian slang for vomit, and possibly originated through the rhyming slang of Chunder Loo and spew (another slang word for vomit).

Surge in popularity

At the end of the 19th century, leather shoes and boots became affordable to the masses, and with the outbreak of World War I in 1914, the demand for large numbers of polished army boots led to a need in the market for a product that would allow boots to be polished quickly, efficiently and easily.  The polish was also used to shine leather belts, handgun holsters, and horse tack. This demand led to a rapid increase in the sales of shoe and boot polish. The popularity of Kiwi shoe polish spread throughout the British Commonwealth and the United States. Rival brands began to emerge, including Shinola and Cavalier (United States), Cherry Blossom (United Kingdom), Parwa (India), Jean Bart (France), and many others. Advertising became more prominent; many shoe polish brands used fictional figures or historical characters to spread awareness of their products.  In the German documentary of 1927 Berlin: Symphony of a Metropolis, a scene focuses on shoe shining with a polish called Nigrin sporting the face of a black person.

Shoe manufacturing improvements in the mid-19th century allowed for factories to produce large numbers of shoes made of leather, and later synthetic materials. This increase in leather shoe production continued well into the 20th century and led to a surge in the number of retail shoe stores in the industrialized world, and subsequently a call for shoe polish by footwear consumers.

Shoe polish was to be found just about everywhere Allied troops ventured. American war correspondent Walter Graeber wrote for TIME magazine from the Tobruk trenches in 1942 that "old tins of British-made Kiwi polish lay side by side with empty bottles of Chianti." A story indicative of the rise in global significance of shoe polish is told by Jean (Gertrude) Williams, a New Zealander who lived in Japan during the Allied occupation straight after World War II.  American soldiers were then finding the dullness of their boots and shoes to be a handicap when trying to win the affections of Japanese women. U.S. military footwear of the time was produced in brown leather with the rough side out.

When the British Commonwealth Occupation Forces arrived in Japan—all with boots polished to a degree not known in the U.S. forces—the G.I.s were more conscious than ever of their feet. The secret was found to rest not only in spit and polish, but in the superior Australian boot polish, a commodity which was soon exchanged with the Americans on a fluctuating basis of so many packets of cigarettes for one can of Kiwi boot polish.

Soldiers returning from the war continued to use the product, leading to a further surge in its popularity. While Kiwi shoe polish was what business historian Alfred D. Chandler, Jr. would call a "first mover", Kiwi did not open a manufacturing plant in the US until after World War II.  Prior to this, Cavalier Shoe Polish, founded by James Lobell, had operated in the US since 1913. The sales paradigm of Cavalier polish was to have footwear professionals sell Cavalier's high-end shoe polish to the shoe-buying public. A few years after World War II, Kiwi opened a manufacturing plant in Philadelphia, making only black, brown, and neutral shoe polish in tins. Kiwi purchased Cavalier in 1961, and continued to manufacture products under the name until the year 2000.

Modern day
Shoe polish products are low-value items that are infrequently purchased, as a single can might last several months for even the most frequent user. Consumer demand is inelastic and largely insensitive to price change, while sales volumes are generally low. In the shoe polish market as a whole, some 26% of turnover is accounted for by pastes, 24% by creams, 23% by aerosols, and 13% by liquids. In recent years, the demand for shoe polish products has either been static or declined; one reason is the gradual replacement of formal footwear with sneakers for everyday use.

There are numerous branded products available, as well as generic store brands. There are two chief areas of shoe polish sales: to the public, and to specialists and trade, such as shoe repairers, and cobblers. The sales percentages between the two outlets are roughly comparable.  The best-selling, low-cost brands are produced by these companies: Kiwi, Griffin, Tana, and Johnson, and Reckitt & Colman.  Approximately 60 million units are sold annually.  Other leading brands include Kelly's, Shinola, Lincoln Shoe Polish, Meltonian, Angelus, Woly, Salamander, Collonil and Cherry Blossom.

Kiwi was acquired by the American company Sara Lee following its purchase of Reckitt and Colman in 1991 and Knomark with its brand Esquire Shoe Polish in 1987. The Federal Trade Commission ruled that Sara Lee had to divest its ownership of these companies in 1994 to prevent it from becoming a monopoly. Since this ruling, Sara Lee has been prevented from acquiring any further assets or firms associated with chemical shoe care products in the United States without prior approval. The Competition Commission in the United Kingdom investigated the potential monopoly of Sara Lee in the shoe care industry.

In recent years, there has been a rise in popularity of high-end shoe polishes, such as Saphir made by Avel and Boot Black made by Columbus.

Usage
Shoe polish is applied to the shoe using a rag, cloth, brush, or with bare fingers. Shoe polish is not a cleaning product: it is suited for clean and dry shoes. A vigorous rubbing action to apply the polish evenly to the boot, followed by further buffing with a clean dry cloth or brush, usually provides good results. Another technique, known as spit-polishing or bull polishing, involves gently rubbing polish into the leather with a cloth and a drop of water or spit. This action achieves the mirror-like, high-gloss finish sometimes known as a spit shine or bull which is especially valued in military organizations. Despite the term, saliva is less commonly used as the vehicle or diluent with polish than is water.  Polishes containing carnauba wax can be used as a protective coating to extend the life and look of a leather shoe.

Shoe polish may be purchased pre-soaked into a hard sponge, which can be used to buff leather without needing to apply any additional polish to either the leather or the sponge. This is usually known as an applicator.

Related products
Many products are closely related to shoe polish, but not strictly considered as such. Other chemical products may be used to clean and shine shoes—in particular whiteners for white shoes, and a variety of sprays and aerosols for cleaning and waterproofing suede shoes. A banana peel can also be used to effectively shine shoes, but it is not recommended.

Although shoe polish is primarily intended for leather shoes, some brands specify that it may be used on non-porous materials, such as vinyl. The polish is generally the same colour as the shoes it will be used upon, or it may be neutral, lacking any colouring agents.

Safety and environmental considerations

Shoe polish is such a niche market that its environmental impact is negligible. Solvent evaporation is one issue. Dyes and pigments with "severe carcinogenic profiles" have been removed from most formulations.

See also
 Leather: preservation and conditioning

References

External links

 
 How shoe polish is made (video)

 
Footwear accessories
Cleaning products
British inventions